Michaela Badinková (born 25 January 1979) is a Slovak actress.

Biography 
Badinková was born in Malacky, Czechoslovakia. She studied Conservatory in Bratislava and Academy of Performing Arts in Prague.

Theatre

Divadlo Na Fidlovačce
Megan McCormick .... Meg (Ken Ludwig)
Balada pro banditu .... Erzsika
Harvey and me
Le baruffe chiozzotte .... Checca
Divotvorný hrnec .... Káča
Thoroughly Modern Millie .... Millie Dillmount

Theatre Disk
Orestes

ABC Theatre
Anna Karenina .... Anna Karenina

Filmography 
Karamazovi (2008)
Velkofilm (2007)
"Ulice" (2005) TV series .... Lenka Drápalová
Clochemerle (2004)
Jak básníci neztrácejí naději (2004) .... Anna Posedlá aka Squrriel
Juraj Kováč (2001 (TV)
"The Immortal" (2000) TV series

External links 
 Photography in iDnes.cz
Website Fidlovačka Theatre

1979 births
Living people
People from Malacky
Slovak television actresses
Slovak film actresses
Slovak stage actresses
20th-century Slovak actresses
21st-century Slovak actresses
Slovak expatriates in the Czech Republic
Academy of Performing Arts in Prague alumni